Cladonia anaemica is a species of cup lichen in the family Cladoniaceae. It is found in Brazil.

References

anaemica
Lichen species
Taxa named by William Nylander (botanist)
Lichens of Brazil
Lichens described in 1860